Andreas Albech (born 20 October 1991) is a Danish footballer who most recently played for Vendsyssel FF. He played one season as a full-time professional but did not enjoy it and after suffering a knee injury started working for a bank.

References

1991 births
Living people
Danish men's footballers
Eliteserien players
Skive IK players
Valur (men's football) players
Sarpsborg 08 FF players
Danish 1st Division players
Úrvalsdeild karla (football) players
Danish expatriate men's footballers
Expatriate footballers in Iceland
Danish expatriate sportspeople in Iceland
Expatriate footballers in Norway
Danish expatriate sportspeople in Norway
Association football defenders